Mirza Reza Kermani (Persian: میرزا رضا کرمانی) ( Born in 1854 in Kerman, Persia (modern Iran) – 10 August 1896 in Tehran) was an adherent of Jamal al-Din al-Afghani and an Iranian who assassinated King Nasser-al-Din.

Background
He and other followers of al-Afghani were demanding that the Qajar dynasty rule Persia/Iran justly. After al-Afghani was expelled from Iran by the Qajars, Kermani began to openly and publicly criticize Qajar officials. Eventually Kermani was imprisoned, his wife divorced him, and his son was made into a servant. In 1895, he visited Jamal al-Din al-Afghani in Istanbul, and they planned the assassination of Nasser-al-Din Shah, before Kermani returned to Iran.

Assassination of Nasser-al-Din Shah
On 1 May 1896, Kermani assassinated Nasser-al-Din Shah in the Shah Abdol Azim shrine. 

He is reported to have said "I had a chance to kill him (the Shah) before, but I didn't because the Jews were celebrating their picnic after the 8th day of Passover. I did not want the Jews to be accused of killing the Shah." 

It is said that the revolver used to assassinate him was old and rusty, and had he worn a thicker overcoat, or been shot from a longer range, he would have survived the attempt on his life. Shortly before dying the Shah is reported to have said, "I will rule you differently if I survive!"

Capture and death

After killing the Shah, Mirza Reza Kermani escaped towards the border of the Ottoman Empire. Nasser-al-Din's successor Mozaffar ad-Din Shah sent a detachment of troops on camels to find Mirza Reza Kermani to avenge his father's death. He was captured at the Ottoman border. After months of interrogation, Kermani was executed by public hanging on August 10, 1896.

Some people in Tehran promoted the idea that Mirza Reza was a Bahá'í but historical documents shows he was born in a Shia family.

Consequences
Kermani's assassination of Nasser-al-Din Shah and the subsequent execution marked a turning point in Iranian political thought that would ultimately lead to the Iranian Constitutional Revolution during Mozaffar ad-Din Shah's turbulent reign; the Constitutional Revolution was the first major democratic movement in the modern Middle East, although it was preceded by the First Constitutional Era (1876–78) in the neighboring Ottoman Empire.

References

1854 births
1896 deaths
Assassins of heads of state
People from Kerman
People of the Persian Constitutional Revolution
Iranian activists
Regicides
Executed assassins
People executed by Iran by hanging
People from Kerman Province
1896 murders in Iran